Hibbertia silvestris is a species of flowering plant in the family Dilleniaceae and is endemic to the south-west of Western Australia. It is a prostrate to more or less erect or spreading shrub with hairy young branchlets, elliptic to egg-shaped leaves with the narrower end towards the base and yellow flowers with seven to ten stamens on one side of two softly-hairy carpels.

Description
There are seven to ten stamens on one side of the two softly-hairy carpels, and five to twelve staminodes on the other side of the carpels, each carpel with two ovules. Flowering occurs from August to January.

Taxonomy
Hibbertia silvestris was first formally described in 1904 by Ludwig Diels in Botanische Jahrbücher für Systematik, Pflanzengeschichte und Pflanzengeographie. The specific epithet (silvestris) means "living in woods".

Distribution and habitat
This hibbertia grows in moist forest in the Jarrah Forest, Swan Coastal Plain and Warren biogeographic regions of south-western Western Australia.

See also
List of Hibbertia species

References

silvestris
Eudicots of Western Australia
Plants described in 1904
Taxa named by Ludwig Diels